Krishan Maheson (born 4 May 1983), known as Krishan, is a rap artist from Sri Lanka. Krishan specialises in rap music, and is one of the pioneer Tamil rap artists in the world. Krishan helped start the Tamil rap scene in Sri Lanka, together with his brother, Gajan, and fellow MC Yauwanan. Krishan migrated to Darwin, Australia in 2018 which makes another legendary Sri Lankan Tamil artist leaving the country.

History 
Krishan was founding member of Urban Sound with his brother, Gajan; together the duo released “Smooth Flow” in 1998. The duo was influenced by local hip hop legends Brown Boogie Nation and Rude Boy Republic. Being mentored by Brown Boogie Nation, the duo released several english rap singles, and developed a following in Colombo. The duo split in early 2000, when Gajan left to join Bathiya and Santhush and Krishan joined Iraj Weeraratne. Krishan was later featured in many singles produced under Iraj, including “Ninda Noyena Hadawe”, “Ran Ran Ran”, “Koththu song” and ” Mata Aloke Genadhewi”. Krishan left Sri Lanka to attend university in the United Kingdom in 2005, prior to that he completed his solo debut album Asian Avenue. This was the first ever Sri Lankan album to be released by Universal Music India in 2006, and was followed by Bathiya and Santhush‘s CMB to Mumbai in 2007.

Singles from Asian Avenue were widely accepted by the Tamils worldwide. Hit singles from the album include “J Town Story”, “Raja Raja Sozha”, ” Kaadhal Kadidham”, and “Ninaivugale”. Krishan hosted performances at many clubs and events in the UK promoting this album. This opened the door to a new era of Tamil rap music in europe. Asian Avenue was produced by Yohan R.

After several Krishan released his second album, Avadhaaram. It was panned by critics, who stated that the rapper had lost his touch. However, two singles from this album were worldwide hits. “Amudhame” was nominated as one of the most promising songs for 2008 by BBC Radio 1, and was placed on high rotatation by British DJ  Nihal. Amudhame also won him an award at AVIMA in 2009 as the best hip-hop solo act. "Oh Oh Endhan Darling" was a massive commercial success, and was played at stations and clubs worldwide. The song was included on Radio Express’s Dance Express compilation along with big names Jason Derulo, Pitbull and Rhianna. The song was also included in the Best of Hip Hop and RNB 2010 Vol. 3, an album of the best 100 tracks from the world.

Krishan recently set up his own digital label Connect Media, and owns a studio in Colombo. He is rumoured to be working on a third album, with a focus on his rapping and lyrical skills. The album boasts big names from the South Indian music scene. The album was scheduled to be released in December 2011. Krishan is also rumored to be working with prominent South Indian music directors on film projects. He has been featured on many Kollywood movie soundtracks.

Krishan was also a member of the ILL Noize hiphop crew with Iraj Weeraratne, and released Sri Lanka's first ever Tri-lingual album in 2001 titled "Iraj". He was featured in hit singles "Ran Ran", "Ninda noyena hanadawe", and Sri Lanka's first ever Tamil rap song "J Town Story". Krishan later released his solo album and Sri Lanka's first ever Tamil hiphop album "Asian Avenue" in 2005 under M Entertainments and Universal music India and this was the first ever Sri Lankan Tamil album to be released in South India. The album consisted of many hits including "Tholaa", "Raja raja Sozhaa", "Kaadhal Kadidham" and "Ninaivugalae". The album opened doors for Krishan to reach out to the young Tamil diaspora markets in Europe and Canada in the mid 2000s.

He later came back to the music scene after a 5-year absence with the album "Avathaaram" in 2010, and the album was not promoted well, hence not giving him the adequate come back the listeners expected. He later ventured into the South Indian movie market by working with prominent music directors Vijay Antony, D.Imman and Paul Jacob. Krishan was featured on the 2012 hit single "Makkayaala" from the Naan movie and also was on movies such as Amba samuthra Ambani, Yuvan Yuvadhi, Sattapadi Kuttram, Om obama and Naan.

Krishan Maheson was the recipient of the best rap act at the local DMVA 2011, as well as the Best Hip hop solo act at the AVIMA (Malaysia) in 2009.

Discography
 Urban Sound Mixtape (1999)
 Iraj (2004)
 Asian Avenue (2005)
 Avadhaaram (2010)

References 

1983 births
Living people
Sri Lankan rappers
Tamil rappers
Sri Lankan Tamil musicians